"When the Sun Goes Down" is a song written by Brett James and recorded by American country music artist Kenny Chesney as a duet with Uncle Kracker.  It was released in February 2004 as the second single and title track from Chesney's 2004 album of the same name.  The song reached number one on the US Billboard Hot Country Singles & Tracks chart on April 3, holding the number one position for five weeks.  It also reached number 26 on the Billboard Hot 100. It was Uncle Kracker's first appearance on the country music charts, his next one being "Smile".

The song appears on the game Karaoke Revolution Country.

Music video
The music video was directed by Shaun Silva, and premiered on CMT on February 6, 2004. The video shoot took place during Chesney's Keg in the Closet Tour at small venues near college campuses, including the 40 Watt Club in Athens, Georgia. The beach scenes were shot in South Florida.

Chart performance
"When the Sun Goes Down" debuted at number 40 on the U.S. Billboard Hot Country Songs chart for the week of February 7, 2004.

Charts

Weekly charts

Year-end charts

Certifications

References

2004 singles
Kenny Chesney songs
Uncle Kracker songs
Male vocal duets
Songs written by Brett James
Music videos directed by Shaun Silva
Song recordings produced by Buddy Cannon
BNA Records singles
2004 songs